A small outline transistor (SOT) is a family of small footprint, discrete surface mount transistor commonly used in consumer electronics.  The most common SOT are SOT23 variations,
also manufacturers offer the nearly identical thin small outline transistor (TSOT) package, where lower height is important.

SOT23-3, SOT323, SOT416
The SOT23-3 package is very popular and a common package for transistors, and is also used for diodes and voltage regulators.

SOT23-5, SOT353, SOT553

SOT23-6, SOT363, SOT563

SOT23-8

SOT54
SOT54 is an alternate designation for the JEDEC TO-92 package.

SOT143, SOT343

SOT490

SOT89-3
The SOT89-3 electrically only has three leads (contact/pin). The wide lead (tab) is physically part of the middle lead on the other side of the package. Some call this package a SOT89-4, since it visually appears to have four leads when looking down at the part.

SOT89-5
The SOT89-5 electrically only has five leads (contact/pin). The middle lead is physically part of the middle lead on the other side of the package. Some call this package a SOT89-6, since it visually appears to have six leads when looking down at the part.

SOT223 (SOT223-4)
The SOT223-4 package is a popular package for voltage regulators. It was introduced by Philips.

SOT223-5
The SOT223-5 package is a popular package for voltage regulators.

SOT223-8
The SOT223-8 package is a popular package for bridged quad transistors.

See also
 List of electronics package dimensions

References

Semiconductor packages